Centropus colossus  is an extinct species of coucal from the Late Pleistocene of Australia. It was described from submerged subfossil material (a slightly damaged left humerus) collected in 1979 from the Fossil Cave in the south-east of South Australia. Characteristics of the holotype specimen indicate that the bird was either flightless or, at least, had reduced flight capability. It was larger than any of its living congeners and was one of the largest cuckoos in the world. The specific epithet, the Latin colossus, refers to its great size.

References

Fossil taxa described in 1985
Birds described in 1985
Centropus
Pleistocene birds
Quaternary birds of Australia